Huron Capital Partners, LLC is a Detroit-based private equity firm specializing in the recapitalization of private companies in the lower middle-market. It was founded in 1999. and has invested in or acquired more than 130 companies. 

Huron Capital has raised more than $1.8 billion of capital through its six private equity funds. The company currently targets companies with revenue up to $200 million. In 2016, the company completed 16 add-on deals across eight different platform companies, within 11 different states. In August 2020, the company completed its 200th acquisition since 1999.

References

Financial services companies established in 1999
Private equity firms of the United States
1999 establishments in Michigan